Santa María Sola is a town and municipality in Oaxaca in south-western Mexico. The municipality covers an area of  km². 
It is part of the Sola de Vega District in the Sierra Sur Region.

References

Municipalities of Oaxaca